Rade Grbitch or Rade Grbić (Serbian Cyrillic: Раде Грбић; December 24, 1870 – March 5, 1910) was a United States Navy sailor and a recipient of the United States military's highest decoration, the Medal of Honor.

Biography
Grbitch was born December 24, 1870, in Austria-Hungary and joined the Navy from Ohio. He was Serb from Dalmatia. On July 21, 1905, a boiler exploded aboard the  while it was at San Diego, California and sank. During the explosion 66 sailors were killed and almost everyone else on the ship was injured. For his actions during the explosion he received the Medal of Honor January 5, 1906.

He died on March 5, 1910, and is buried in San Francisco National Cemetery
San Francisco, California. His grave can be found in plot A, 44.

Medal of Honor citation
Rank and organization: Seaman, U.S. Navy. Born: 24 December 1870, Austria. Accredited to: Illinois. G.O. No.: 13, 5 January 1906.

Citation: 

On board the U.S.S. Bennington, for extraordinary heroism displayed at the time of the explosion of a boiler of that vessel at San Diego, Calif., 21 July 1905.

See also
List of Medal of Honor recipients in non-combat incidents

References

External links

1870 births
1910 deaths
United States Navy sailors
United States Navy Medal of Honor recipients
People from Illinois
Austro-Hungarian emigrants to the United States
Foreign-born Medal of Honor recipients
American people of Serbian descent
Serbs of Croatia
Burials in California
Non-combat recipients of the Medal of Honor
Burials at San Francisco National Cemetery